General Hein Zielstra (8 November 1908 – 22 January 1981) was a Dutch military officer who served as Chairman of the United Defence Staff of the Armed Forces of the Netherlands between 1965 and 1968.

References

External links 
 

1908 births
1985 deaths
Royal Netherlands Air Force generals
Royal Netherlands Air Force officers
Chiefs of the Defence Staff (Netherlands)